The women's BMX racing competition at the 2008 Summer Olympics took place on August 20–22 at the Laoshan BMX Field, the first to be officially featured in the Olympic cycling program.

Coming out of retirement from her sporting career to try out for BMX at age thirty, France's Anne-Caroline Chausson escaped from an early race crash that left two riders off the ramp to claim the event's inaugural Olympic gold medal. She thundered home on the final stretch to a spectacular finish with a fastest time in 35.976. Chausson also enjoyed her teammate Laëtitia Le Corguillé taking home the silver in 38.042, as she finished the race behind the leader by nearly seven hundredths of a second (0.07) and also, handed the French squad a straight 1–2 finish on the medal podium. Meanwhile, United States' Jill Kintner came up with a powerful, stalwart ride to earn the bronze in 38.674, edging out New Zealand's Sarah Walker by a short sprint distance.

Qualification

Sixteen riders representing twelve countries qualified for the event. Qualification was based on UCI ranking by nations, 2008 UCI BMX World Championships results and wild-cards reserved to a Tripartite Commission (IOC, ANOC, UCI).

Competition format
Each of the 16 women competing performed two runs of the course in individual time trials to determine seeding for the knockout rounds. Then, they were grouped into 2 semifinal groups based on that seeding. Each semifinal consisted of three runs of the course, using a point-for-place system. The top four cyclists in each semifinal (for a total of 8) moved on to the final. Unlike the semifinals, the final consisted of a single race with the first to the finish line claiming the gold medal.

Schedule
All times are China Standard Time (UTC+8)

Results

Seeding

Semifinals

Heat 1

Heat 2

Final

References 

Cycling at the 2008 Summer Olympics
BMX at the Summer Olympics
2008 in women's BMX
Women's events at the 2008 Summer Olympics